Faye Webster (born June 25, 1997) is an American singer-songwriter from Atlanta, Georgia. She has released four studio albums, Run and Tell (2013), Faye Webster (2017), Atlanta Millionaires Club (2019), and I Know I'm Funny Haha (2021).

Early life
Faye Webster was born in Atlanta. Her grandfather was a bluegrass music guitarist in Texas, her mother was guitarist and fiddle player, and her oldest brother played in a rock band in high school. By age 14, she was writing music. She attended Henry W. Grady High School in Atlanta, where she and a group of friends formed a rap group. After watching her perform at open mic nights, her dad advised to her to record her music so that people can take it home with them.

Career
At the age of 16, on October 30, 2013, Webster self-released her debut album, Run and Tell.

After graduating high school, she enrolled in Belmont University in Nashville to study songwriting, but soon dropped out and moved back to Atlanta after deciding that she was "wasting time and money". She made a deal with her parents that she would live at home for a year and if she was not successful as a musician, she would return to college.

Soon after dropping out, in 2017, Webster signed to Awful Records.

In April 2017, she embarked on a 12-city tour with Sean Rowe followed by the release of her second album, the self-titled Faye Webster in May 2017.

Webster signed to the Secretly Canadian record label in late 2018.

Webster released her third full-length album, Atlanta Millionaires Club, in May 2019 via Secretly Canadian.

In March 2019, Webster's song "Room Temperature" was featured in a Rolling Stone article.

In April 2020, Webster released the single "In a Good Way".

Her song "Better Distractions" was featured in an article in Pitchfork in September 2020 and was chosen by President Barack Obama in December 2020 as one of his favorite songs of the year.

In April 2021, she released the single "Cheers" and announced her fourth studio album I Know I'm Funny Haha, which was released on June 25, 2021.

In October 2021, Webster released an EP titled Live at Electric Lady, as part of a Spotify exclusive series of the same name. Recorded at Electric Lady Studios in New York City, the EP features live recordings of songs from her previous two studio albums, as well as a cover version of the song "If You Need to, Keep Time on Me" by Fleet Foxes.

In December 2021, she was announced to be one of the opening acts on an upcoming tour by Haim.

Personal life
Webster is dating Boothlord, a member of Danger Incorporated, a rap duo based in Atlanta. They met when they were both signed to Awful Records and they moved in together during the COVID-19 pandemic. She is passionate about the Atlanta Braves, would leave school early to attend games, and wears team jerseys regularly. She had a crush on Ronald Acuña Jr., a Braves player the same age as her, which inspired her to write at least one song, but the crush dissipated after a meeting with him was "anticlimactic". She got to sing the "Star-Spangled Banner" at a Braves game. Her other hobbies include Pokémon and yo-yo; she has attended the World Yo-Yo Contest. Her photography of local rappers, including classmate Lil Yachty and Shelley FKA DRAM, has been published in media outlets including Billboard, Rolling Stone, and Spotify.

Discography

Studio albums

Extended plays

Singles

As lead artist

As featured artist

External links

References

Living people
American folk singers
American photographers
Secretly Canadian artists
1997 births